A magnitude 6.4 earthquake struck in Pishan County, Hotan Prefecture, Xinjiang, China  southeast of Yilkiqi ( / ), on July 3 at a depth of . The earthquake killed at least 3 people and wounded 71.

Earthquake
The earthquake occurred on a blind thrust fault that ruptured but did not reach the surface. Instead, the earthquake rupture ceased some 3–7 km beneath the surface.

See also
 List of earthquakes in 2015
 List of earthquakes in China

References

External links
 Deadly earthquake China on Earthquake Report Website
 

Pishan
Pishan earthquake
Pishan 2015
Pishan earthquake
Buried rupture earthquakes